Mahmud Shah II (reigned: 1489–1490) was an infant Sultan of Bengal with Habsh Khan as his regent.

Both of them were killed in 1490 CE by Shamsuddin Muzaffar Shah.

See also
List of rulers of Bengal
History of Bengal
History of India

References

Sultans of Bengal
1490 deaths
Year of birth unknown
15th-century Indian monarchs